The Te Mata River is a river of the Coromandel Peninsula in New Zealand's North Island.

The river was once used to wash large kauri logs down to the sea. The headwaters were logged for kauri around 1890-1900. Thames Sawmilling Company cut rimu and miro in the 1960s. The higher areas around Papakai weren't logged. The native frogs, Leiopelma archeyi and Leiopelma hochstetteri, live near the valley.

Gentle Annie mine produced 4.8kg of gold between 1887 and 1889. Gentle Annie Stream joins the river about 3km up from the coast and the find was described as being towards the ridge.

The SH25 bridge was built about 1945.

See also
List of rivers of New Zealand

References

Thames-Coromandel District
Rivers of Waikato
Rivers of New Zealand
Firth of Thames
Hauraki Gulf catchment